Mount Longonot is a stratovolcano located southeast of Lake Naivasha in the Great Rift Valley of Kenya, Africa. It is thought to have last erupted in the 1860s. Its name is derived from the Maasai word Oloonong'ot, meaning "mountains of many spurs" or "steep ridges".

Mount Longonot is protected by Kenya Wildlife Service as part of Mount Longonot National Park. A 3.1 km trail runs from the park entrance up to the crater rim, and continues in a 7.2 km loop encircling the crater. The whole tour (gate-around the rim-gate) of 13.5 km takes about 4–5 hours allowing for necessary rest breaks - parts of the trail are heavily eroded and very steep. The gate elevation is around 2150 m and the peak at 2776 m  but following the jagged rim involves substantially more than the 630 m vertical difference.

Mount Longonot is 60 kilometres northwest of Nairobi and may be reached from there by a tarmac road. A nearby town is also named Longonot. The Longonot satellite earth station is located south of the mountain.

Geology
Longonot is a stratovolcano which contains a large 8 x 12 km caldera formed by vast eruptions of trachytic lava some 21,000 years ago. The current summit cone was developed within the earlier caldera. This cone itself is capped by a 1.8 km crater. The mountain has several parasitic cones and effusive lava eruptions occur on the flanks and within the caldera floor. Periodic geodetic activity recorded at Longonot in 2004–2006 demonstrated the presence of active magmatic systems beneath this volcano.

, geothermal projects struggle to explore the potential.

Flora and fauna
A forest of small trees covers the crater floor, and small steam vents are found spaced around the walls of the crater. The mountain is home to various species of wildlife, notably plains zebra, giraffe, Thomson's gazelle, buffaloes and hartebeest.

Notable Events
On March 21, 2009 bush fires burned up the side of the mountain and descended into the crater, trapping wildlife and feeding on drought ravaged brush.

See also 
 Mount Suswa

References

External links 
Kenya Wildlife Service – Mount Longonot National Park
Webcam pointed at Mt. Longonot from Kijabe

Stratovolcanoes of Kenya
Volcanoes of the Great Rift Valley
Mountains of Kenya
National parks of Kenya
Calderas of Kenya
Northern Acacia-Commiphora bushlands and thickets
Pleistocene stratovolcanoes
Holocene stratovolcanoes
Pleistocene calderas